Taxi is a 1998 French action comedy film starring Samy Naceri, Frédéric Diefenthal and Marion Cotillard, written by Luc Besson and directed by Gérard Pirès. It is the first installment in the Taxi film series. It has four sequels, Taxi 2, Taxi 3, Taxi 4 and Taxi 5 and one English-language remake, Taxi (2004). It also provided the premise for the 2014 American television show, Taxi Brooklyn.

In Spain, the film was released with the title Taxi Express, in order to distinguish it from other films with the same name.

Plot 
Daniel Morales (Samy Naceri) is a highly talented driver living in Marseille, France, who has little regard for traffic laws and the police, and is in a loving relationship with his girlfriend Lilly (Marion Cotillard). He leaves his job as a delivery man at local pizza parlor "Pizza Joe" to become a taxi driver, driving his white custom 1997 Peugeot 406, which is equipped with various racing modifications that are mechanically concealed.

Young, bumbling police inspector Émilien Coutant-Kerbalec (Frédéric Diefenthal) lives with his widowed mother, and has just failed his 8th driver's test. No one takes him seriously at work, including police sergeant Petra (Emma Sjöberg), towards whom he harbors an unrequited crush. Commissioner Gibert (Bernard Farcy) soon briefs the officers on a new case: a German gang that has successfully committed a series of high profile robberies throughout Europe, and has now arrived in Marseille. The gang is known for their efficiency, skilled driving, and their use of red Mercedes-Benz 500E cars as escape vehicles. Anticipating the gang's next move, Gibert places police officers around the targeted bank. After the robbers enter the bank, Émilien accidentally causes a multi-vehicle collision and a gun fight with the French Minister's escort convoy, allowing the Germans to escape.

The next day, Émilien decides to take a taxi to work and rides with Daniel. Not knowing his fare's occupation, Daniel shows off his car and breaks several traffic laws. Émilien detains Daniel, but then asks for his help with catching the German gang in exchange for returning Daniel's license - desperate for respect and Petra's attention. Looking at photos of the getaway cars, Daniel concludes that the tires come from a garage owned by Kruger, the only German mechanic in town. Daniel reluctantly joins Émilien at a stakeout of the garage, where they spot the German robbers. The next morning, Émilien tries to interrogate Kruger, who opens fire at the duo and escapes.

The police locate the gang's next target and manage to shoot a tracking device onto one of the cars. However, the gang stops at a secluded garage and repaints the cars silver, inadvertently sabotaging the tracking device and allowing them to escape again. Émilien then learns that he had left the stove on at his flat and burned it down, forcing him and his mother to stay at Daniel's place. Eager to get rid of Émilien, Daniel correctly deduces the gang's repaint strategy, and through a friend he tracks the robbers to a racetrack. Daniel provokes the gang into a race and wins, later inspring Émilien to approach Petra romantically. The duo then become friends, and devise a plan to finally catch the gang red-handed.

The next day, having duplicated the control keys to twenty traffic lights throughout the city, Émilien provides Daniel with a closed radio line. Daniel recruits his old co-workers from Pizza Joe, to whom Émilien distributes the keys and walkie-talkies. After the gang drives away from another robbery, Daniel follows them and successfully taunts the Germans into another race. As the delivery men use the traffic lights to clear a path for the cars, the cars drive onto the freeway. Daniel then speeds towards a bridge that is under construction, and slams on the brake; the gang's cars jump over the gap and lands on the other side, only to discover that they are trapped on an incomplete bridge section.

After the gang is arrested, Daniel and Émilien are given medals by the police commissioner, and Émilien begins dating Petra. The film ends with Daniel competing at the French Grand Prix in a Formula 3000, sponsored by (to Daniel's dismay) the Marseille Police.

Cast

Production

Development
Luc Besson came up with the idea for the movie in 1996, but he was too busy with The Fifth Element to direct it at the time, so he decided to simply produce it. He presented his idea to his usual production company, Gaumont, but Gaumont had no trust in the project and turned Besson down. Besson went to two old friends, Michèle and Laurent Pétin, who headed the small production company ARP. They came to an agreement on a 50/50 split, and Besson began searching for a director. He knew Gérard Pirès from a long ago, but Pirès hadn't directed a film in 15 years. He had, however, been directing commercials and especially ones for Peugeot, making him a good fit in the end. For budgetary reasons, the location was chosen as Marseille and the actors relative unknowns at the time. Better known actors were approached, but they turned the project down. The young unknown actors were explained to financiers such as Canal+ as being easier to identify with for a young audience and also being a bet on the future. The main music theme is based on Misirlou, a popular song of Eastern Mediterranean origin.

Reception

Box office
In terms of box office admissions, the Taxi series is one of the most successful French franchises ever. The first film was the fourth most successful film in France for the year with 6.4 million admissions and a gross of $39.3 million. It had 2.2 million admissions abroad. The film also had very good TV ratings with 12 millions viewers on TF1.

Critical response
Almar Haflidason, reviewing the film for BBC, gave it three stars out of five, describing that there was "fun to be had from this film when it's in motion, but the script is a real blow out." In a research article for the journal French Cultural Studies, Ipek A. Celik Rappas from Koç University describes how the Taxi series "reflects the move in Luc Besson’s career from director to producer of big-budget films, and reveals how his relationship with post-industrial spaces changes as his film locations turn into film-related investments."

Remake 
  
An American remake, also titled Taxi, starring Queen Latifah, Jimmy Fallon, and Gisele Bündchen, was released in October 2004, and was panned by critics. A remake of the original film as a summer series, known as Taxi Brooklyn, aired in August 2014 on NBC. The Bollywood film Dhoom (2004) also draws heavily on the plot of Taxi.

References

External links

 
 
 
 

1998 films
1990s buddy films
1998 action comedy films
1990s crime comedy films
1990s police comedy films
1990s chase films
EuropaCorp films
StudioCanal films
Films about bank robbery
Films about taxis
Films directed by Gérard Pirès
Films produced by Luc Besson
Films set in Marseille
French action comedy films
French crime comedy films
1990s French-language films
Films with screenplays by Luc Besson
Taxi (film series)
1998 comedy films
1990s French films